Thomas Earl Dukes (born August 31, 1942) is an American retired professional baseball player. The native of Knoxville, Tennessee, was a right-handed relief pitcher who appeared in 161 games over six seasons (1967–1972) for the Houston Astros, San Diego Padres, Baltimore Orioles and California Angels of Major League Baseball.

Dukes signed with the New York Yankees in 1960 but never appeared for the Bombers, who traded him to the Milwaukee Braves for veteran reliever Bobby Tiefenauer in June 1965. The Braves passed him along to the Astros in a six-player trade at the end of 1966. On October 14, he was the 33rd player selected by the Padres in the National League portion of the 1968 Major League Baseball expansion draft.

He was traded along with Pat Dobson to the defending World Series Champion Orioles for Enzo Hernández, Tom Phoebus, Fred Beene and Al Severinsen on December 1, 1970. While his San Diego teammate Dobson became one of the 1971 Orioles' four twenty-game winners—and the Baltimore staff threw 71 complete games—Dukes was credited with four saves, tied for second on the team, but he lost five of six decisions for a team that won 101 regular-season games. Baltimore breezed to its third consecutive American League championship, but fell to the Pittsburgh Pirates in the 1971 World Series; Dukes worked in Games 3 and 5 and allowed no runs and two hits in four innings pitched, with one strikeout.

Dukes' last Oriole appearance was in Game 5 on October 14, 1971. He was sent to Triple-A Rochester to start , then traded to the Angels on May 29. In seven June games with the Angels, he posted a 1.64 earned run average. He also appeared in six games for Triple-A Salt Lake City that year, his final campaign in pro ball.

As a big leaguer, Dukes compiled a 5–16 (.238) record and a 4.35 earned run average with 22 career saves. In 217 innings pitched, he permitted 226 hits and 82 bases on balls; he struck out 169.

References

External links

Tom Dukes at Pura Pelota (Venezuelan Professional Baseball League)

1942 births
Living people
Atlanta Crackers players
Auburn Yankees players
Augusta Yankees players
Austin Braves players
Baltimore Orioles players
Baseball players from Knoxville, Tennessee
California Angels players
Cardenales de Lara players
American expatriate baseball players in Venezuela
Columbus Confederate Yankees players
Elmira Pioneers players
Houston Astros players
Major League Baseball pitchers
Oklahoma City 89ers players
Richmond Braves players
Richmond Virginians (minor league) players
Rochester Red Wings players
St. Petersburg Saints players
Salt Lake City Angels players
San Diego Padres players
Tennessee Volunteers baseball players
Toledo Mud Hens players